Midnight Daydream is the only studio album by Bruce Cameron, released in 1999.

Track listing
"Midnight Daydream" – 6:42
"Doctor Please" – 4:52
"Mind Gardens" – 5:24
"Miles Away" – 3:29
"Born to Lose" – 5:32
"I Want to Be Late" – 4:19
"Forever Rebel Girls" – 6:18
"Just Like a Spaceman" – 3:57
"So Aliens Have Been Here" – 4:25
"A Thousand Moons" – 3:54
"Raining the Blues" – 4:39
"Day After Yesterday" – 3:27
"Falling Up a Mountain" – 4:09
"She's So Gone" – 2:28

Midnight Dream is now available as a free full MP3 download from Cameron's label, Brain Cell Records: http://www.soundtrax.net/download/MidnightDaydream.htm

1999 albums